National Secondary Route 204, or just Route 204 (or ) is a National Road Route of Costa Rica, located in the San José province.

Description
In San José province the route covers San José canton (Catedral, Zapote, San Francisco de Dos Ríos districts).

References

Highways in Costa Rica